Tieshangang District, is a district of the city of Beihai, Guangxi, China. It has 3 neighborhood committees and 39 village committees.
 Area: 
 Population: 
 District seat: Nankang Town

Subdivisions
3 towns:
 Nankang
 Yingpan
 Xinggang

Transportation
The Yulin–Tieshangang railway carries freight services to and from the coast.

External links
 Official site 
 Map

County-level divisions of Guangxi
Beihai